Bredow may refer to:

 Szczecin-Drzetowo, a suburb of Szczecin, known in German as Stettin-Bredow

Bredow is also the surname of several people, including:

 Reinhard Bredow (born 1947), East German luger
 Ferdinand von Bredow (1884–1934), German Major and head of the Abwehr (1932–1933)
 Adalbert von Bredow (1814–1890), German soldier and war hero
 Gottfried Gabriel Bredow (1773–1814), German historian
 Hans Bredow (1879–1959), German engineer
 Ilse von Bredow (1922–2014), German author
 Ingo von Bredow (1939–2015), German sailor and Olympic medalist
 Kaspar Ludwig von Bredow (1685–1773), tutor of Frederick the Great.
 Frederick Siegmund von Bredow (1683–1759), General of Frederick the Great
 Asmus Ehrenreich von Bredow (1693–1756), Lieutenant General, Governor of Kolberg